Varsha is the season of monsoon in the Hindu calendar. It is one of the six seasons (ritu), each lasting two months, the others being Vasanta (spring), Grishma (summer), Sharada (autumn), Hemanta (pre-winter), and Shishira (winter).

It falls in the two months of Shravana and Bhadrapada of the Hindu calendar, or July and August of the Gregorian calendar. It is preceded by Grishma, the summer season, and followed by Sharada, the autumn season.

References 

Hindu calendar
Seasons